Nyköpingsån is a river primarily flowing through Södermanland County in Sweden. The river is named after Nyköping, where it flows into the Baltic Sea. Nyköping is also the largest settlement on the river proper and a large part of the drainage area water is in the corresponding municipality. Nyköpingsån is one of two rivers to flow into the harbour of Nyköping, the other being Kilaån that winds through the southwestern part of the municipality eastwards from Kolmården.

The innermost and most elevated riverside locality is in Åsbro at  when the river passes through the lake of Tisaren. Although a shorter and lower route, it also leads into the lake of Tisnaren in Östergötland County in the north of Finspång Municipality. That source is further down towards but not quite at Simonstorp in Norrköping Municipality, making it a tri-county river. The river flows out of several sizeable lakes in Södermanland's interior, the two largest being Båven and Yngaren.

Most of the river and its drainage area lakes are navigable by small boats, except for hydroelectrical, artificial waterfalls in Nyköping. Some river passages between lakes are very narrow. At the innermost part, the gap between two lakes in the drainage area of Nyköpingsån and the one of Vättern and Motala ström is just above . This narrowly avoids making the area between Motala and Nyköping a natural island. Also near Simonstorp the system is also merely a kilometer away from where the source of the aforementioned Kilaån is.

Locations in the drainage area
The localities are listed sorted after distance to the maritime outflow in Nyköping.

 Åsbro
 Svennevad
 Kilsmo
 Brevens bruk
 Högsjö
 Vingåker
 Regna
 Hävla
 Katrineholm
 Flen
 Sparreholm
 Vadsbro
 Björkvik
 Bettna
 Vrena
 Stigtomta
 Nyköping

Larger lakes
 Båven
 Hallbosjön
 Kolsnaren
 Lidsjön
 Långhalsen
 Sottern
 Tisnaren
 Yngaren

References

Rivers of Sweden